The Night Talk (German: Das Nachtgespräch) is a 1917 German silent crime film directed by Adolf Gärtner and Erich Kaiser-Titz, Reinhold Schünzel and Bruno Ziener.

Cast
 Erich Kaiser-Titz as Phantomas 
 Else Eckersberg
 Reinhold Schünzel
 Bruno Ziener

References

Bibliography
 Bock, Hans-Michael & Bergfelder, Tim. The Concise CineGraph. Encyclopedia of German Cinema. Berghahn Books, 2009.

External links

1917 films
Films of the German Empire
German silent feature films
Films directed by Adolf Gärtner
German black-and-white films
1917 crime films
German crime films
1910s German films